Atla wheldonii is a species of terricolous (ground-dwelling), crustose lichen in the family Verrucariaceae. Found in Europe, it was formally described as a new species in 1947 by William Gladstone Travis from specimens collected from sand dunes in Lancashire, England, in 1924. Sanja Savić and Leif Tibell transferred the taxon to genus Atla in 2008 following molecular phylogenetic analysis that showed that it, along with three other Northern European species, comprised a distinct clade in the Verrucariacae.

In additional to the British Isles, Atla wheldonii has also been recorded in the Pyrenees, Austria, and Scandinavia. It grows on basic soil, usually alongside mosses and cyanobacteria; typical lichen associates include Thelocarpon impressellum and Solorina spongiosa, and sometimes Polyblastia helvetica. Atla wheldonii has a thin and poorly developed thallus, and ascomata in the forms or perithecia that are immersed in the thallus.

References

Verrucariales
Lichen species
Lichens described in 1947
Lichens of Central Europe
Lichens of Northern Europe